The Garden Tomb is a rock-cut tomb in Jerusalem, which was unearthed in 1867 and is considered by some Protestants to be the site of the burial and resurrection of Jesus. The tomb has been dated by Israeli archaeologist Gabriel Barkay to the 8th–7th centuries BC. The re-use of old tombs was not an uncommon practice in ancient times, but this would seem to contradict the biblical text that speaks of a new, not reused, tomb made for himself by Joseph of Arimathea (Matthew 27:57–60, John 19:41). Also, the trough in front of the tomb and the nearby cistern, described by proponents of the Garden Tomb as part of the tomb's sealing system and as the surrounding garden's source of water, respectively, have both been archaeologically dated to the Crusader period (12th–13th centuries). The organisation maintaining the Garden Tomb refrains from claiming that this is the authentic tomb of Jesus, while pointing out the similarities with the site described in the Bible, and the fact that the Garden Tomb better preserves its ancient outlook than the more traditional, but architecturally altered and time-damaged tomb from the mostly crowded Church of the Holy Sepulchre; for all of these reasons, they suggest that the Garden Tomb is more evocative of the events described in the Gospels.

The Garden Tomb is adjacent to a rocky escarpment which since the mid-nineteenth century has been proposed by some scholars to be Golgotha. It has since been known as Skull Hill or Gordon's Calvary after Charles Gordon. In contradistinction to this modern identification, the traditional site where the death and resurrection of Christ are believed to have occurred has been the Church of the Holy Sepulchre at least since the fourth century.

Since 1894, the Garden Tomb and its surrounding gardens have been maintained as a place of Protestant worship and reflection by a Protestant non-denominational charitable trust based in the United Kingdom named The Garden Tomb (Jerusalem) Association, a member of the Evangelical Alliance of Israel and the World Evangelical Alliance. As such, the Garden Tomb stands as a popular site of pilgrimage for many Christians, especially Evangelicals and other Protestants.

Site inside the church: attitudes throughout history

According to the Bible, Jesus was crucified near the city of Jerusalem, outside its walls, and there has always been concern on the issue of the tomb of Jesus being inside the city walls, with various explanations, often fictional ones, coming up during the centuries.

Early medieval views
For example, as early as 754 AD Saint Willibald wrote that Helena, after finding the Cross, included the site within the city walls. Some two-and-a-half centuries later, Saewulf (c. 1108 AD) maintained that it was Hadrian who enclosed the traditional Golgotha and Tomb of Christ within the city limits when he rebuilt the city during the second century AD, though they were previously outside the city. The two explanations obviously contradicted each other, since Hadrian's rebuilding of Jerusalem as Aelia Capitolina predated Helena's pilgrimage there by close to two centuries.

Doubts after Reformation
After the Reformation there were increasing doubts regarding the traditional holy places. In 1639 Quaresmius speaks of "western heretics" who argue that the traditional site could not possibly be the true tomb of Christ. The first extant publication which argues a case against the traditional location was written by the German pilgrim Jonas Korte in 1741, a few years after his pilgrimage to Jerusalem. His book contained a chapter titled "On Mount Calvary, which now lies in the middle of the town and cannot therefore be the true Calvary".

19th-century Protestant doubts
In 1812, also Edward D. Clarke rejected the traditional location as a "mere delusion, a monkish juggle"<ref>Clarke, Edward Daniel (1817). Travels in various countries of Europe, Asia and Africa: Part II – Greece, Egypt, and the Holy Land, section I (vol. IV), 4th edition, London, p. 335</ref> and suggested instead that the crucifixion took place just outside Zion Gate. During the 19th century travel from Europe to the Ottoman Empire became easier and therefore more common, especially in the late 1830s due to the reforms of the Egyptian ruler, Muhammad Ali.Kark, Ruth and Frantzman, Seth J. "The Protestant Garden Tomb in Jerusalem, Englishwomen, and a Land Transaction in Late Ottoman Palestine" in Palestine Exploration Quarterly, 142, 3 (London 2010), pp. 199–216 The subsequent influx of Christian pilgrims to Jerusalem included more Protestants who doubted the authenticity of the traditional holy sites – doubts which were exacerbated by the fact that Protestants had no territorial claims at the Church of the Holy Sepulchre and by the feeling of Protestant pilgrims that it was an unnatural setting for contemplation and prayer.

In 1841, Dr. Edward Robinson's "Biblical Researches in Palestine", at that time considered the standard work on the topography and archaeology of the Holy Land, argued against the authenticity of the traditional location, concluding: "Golgotha and the Tomb shown in the Church of the Holy Sepulchre are not upon the real places of the Crucifixion and Resurrection". Robinson argued that the traditional location would have been within the city walls also during the Herodian era, primarily due to topographical considerations. Robinson was careful not to propose an alternative site and had concluded that it would be impossible to identify the true location of the holy places. However, he did suggest that the crucifixion would have taken place somewhere on the road to Jaffa or the road to Damascus. Skull Hill and the Garden Tomb are located in close proximity to the Damascus road, about 200 m. from Damascus Gate.

Contemporary scholarship
Contemporary scholars, such as Professor Dan Bahat, one of Israel's leading archaeologists, have concluded that the Church of the Holy Sepulchre is located in an area which was outside the city walls in the days of Jesus and therefore indeed constitutes a plausible location for the crucifixion and burial of Jesus.

Discovery
Skull Hill identified as Calvary

Motivated by these concerns, some Protestants in the nineteenth century looked elsewhere in the attempt to locate the site of Christ's crucifixion, burial and resurrection.

Otto Thenius
In 1842, heavily relying on Robinson's research, Otto Thenius, a German theologian and bible scholar from Dresden, was the first to publish a proposal that the rocky knoll north of Damascus Gate, which, as Thenius noticed, resembled a skull, was the biblical Golgotha. The site he suggested contains a few natural cavities as well as a man-made cave, which Christians call Jeremiah's Grotto. Thenius went so far as to suggest that Jeremiah's Grotto was in fact the tomb of Christ.Thenius, Otto (1842). "Golgatha et Sanctum Sepulchrum" (in Latin). In Zeitschrift fir die historische Theologie. Though his proposal for the tomb of Christ did not have a lasting influence, his proposal for Golgotha was endorsed by several other Protestant scholars and pilgrims. Since Golgotha is the Aramaic word for skull, and may perhaps refer to the shape of the place, Thenius concluded that the rocky escarpment was likely to have been Golgotha.

Fisher Howe
A few years later the same identification was endorsed by the American industrialist Fisher Howe, who was also one of the founding members of the board of directors of Union Theological Seminary in New York. In 1850, Howe visited the Holy Land, and endorsed the view that the Church of the Holy Sepulchre could not be the true site of Christ's death and resurrection. Instead, he pointed to the hill containing Jeremiah's Grotto as the true Calvary, though he had only argued this view in length in an essay published in 1871, just after his death. In that essay Howe described the hill in these terms: "[The] hill is left steeply rounded on its west, north, and east sides forming the back and sides of the kranion, or skull. The skull-like front, or face, on the south side is formed by the deep perpendicular cutting and removal of the ledge. To the observer, at a distance, the eyeless socket of the skull would be suggested at once by the yawning cavern, hewn within its face, beneath the hill." Howe claimed that he developed his theory completely independently of Otto Thenius, and that he stumbled upon Thenius' claims only in the course of researching for his essay.

H. B. Tristram
Another early proponent of the theory that Skull Hill is Golgotha was the English scholar and clergyman Canon Henry Baker Tristram, who suggested that identification in 1858 during his first visit to the Holy Land, chiefly because of its proximity to the northern gate, and hence also to the Antonia Fortress, the traditional site of Christ's trial. (Canon Tristram was also one of the advocates of purchasing the nearby Garden Tomb in 1893.)

Claude R. Conder
Another prominent proponent of the "new Calvary" was Claude R. Conder, a lieutenant in the Royal Engineers, who was appointed in 1872 by the Palestine Exploration Fund to conduct a mapping survey of Western Palestine. Conder was repulsed by the Church of the Holy Sepulchre, and especially by the annual "miracle of the Holy Fire", as believed in by Greek Orthodox, Armenian Apostolical and Coptic Christians.

Based on topographical and textual considerations, Conder argued that it would be dangerous and unlikely, from a town-defense point of view, for the walls to have previously been east of the Church of the Holy Sepulchre, concluding that the Church would have been inside the city walls and thus not the authentic tomb of Christ. He instead proposed that the true Calvary was the "rounded knoll" above Jeremiah's Grotto (i.e. Skull Hill). He based this identification on several arguments. First of all, since the Gospel according to John places Golgotha in the near vicinity of a garden and a tomb (John 19:41–42) Conder argued that Golgotha must be close to the necropolis found just north of Jerusalem, near the main road to Nablus, "among the olive-gardens and vineyards of Wady el-Joz". Secondly, Conder proposed that Calvary was the public place of execution and especially noted that Sephardic Jews had regarded the site next to Jeremiah's Grotto as traditionally being a place of stoning, which he saw as corroborative evidence that it was indeed Golgotha. He also pointed to a Christian tradition which associated that general area with the martyrdom of St. Stephen as additional evidence that it was a public place of execution during the New Testament era. Conder actually downplayed the supposed resemblance to a skull which he viewed as immaterial, remarking: "I should not like to base an argument on so slight a resemblance". In his writings Conder refers to Skull Hill by the Arabic name El-Heidhemiyeh which he interpreted as "the rent", and which he proposed was a corruption of El-Heiremiyeh – "the place of Jeremiah".Warren, Charles and Conder, Claude R. (1884). The Survey of Western Palestine: Jerusalem. The Committee of the Palestine Exploration Fund, London, pp. 380–393. However, later research has shown that the name is actually a corruption of El-Adhamiyeh, named after a zawiya which according to Muslim tradition was founded by the celebrated Sufi saint Ibrahim ibn Adham.Hanauer, J. E. "Notes on Skull Hill" in Palestine Exploration Fund – Quarterly Statement for 1894 Charles Wilson spelled the name as El Edhemîyeh.

Proponents in the 1870s
Additionally, in the 1870s the site of Skull Hill was being strongly promoted by several notable figures in Jerusalem, including the American consul to Jerusalem, Selah Merril, who was also a Congregationalist minister and a member of the American Palestine Exploration Society, the Protestant Bishop of Jerusalem Samuel Gobat, who presided over the joint bishopric for Anglicans, Lutherans and Calvinists in the Holy Land, as well as Conrad Schick, a prominent Jerusalem-based architect, city planner, and proto-archaeologist of Swiss origins who penned hundreds of articles for the Palestine Exploration Fund.

In 1879 the French scholar Ernest Renan, author of the influential and controversial Life of Jesus also considered this view as a possibility in one of the later editions of his book.

General Gordon
However, the most famous proponent of the view that Skull Hill is the biblical Golgotha was Major-General Charles Gordon who visited Jerusalem in 1883. His name has become so entwined with Skull Hill that many contemporary news articles and guide books erroneously state that Gordon was the first to discover the site. In reality Gordon was very much influenced by the arguments of Conder and by his conversations and correspondence with Schick.

Gordon went beyond Howe and Conder to passionately propose additional arguments, which he himself confessed were "more fanciful" and imaginative. Gordon proposed a typological reading of Leviticus 1:11: "[The sheep for a burnt-offering] shall be slaughtered on the north side of the altar before the LORD". Gordon interpreted this verse to mean that Christ, the prototype, must also have been slain north of the "altar" (Skull Hill being north of Jerusalem and of the Temple Mount). This typological interpretation is obviously theological and not scientific in nature, which leads to a very skeptical mention by a prominent detractors of "Gordon's Calvary", the researcher and Army officer Charles W. Wilson. Gordon also commented on the appropriateness of the location in a letter he sent to his sister on January 17, 1883, his second day in Jerusalem:

Garden Tomb identified as Jesus' tomb

The Church of the Holy Sepulchre has the tomb just a few yards away from Golgotha, corresponding with the account of John the Evangelist: "Now in the place where he was crucified there was a garden; and in the garden a new sepulchre, wherein was never man yet laid." KJV. In the latter half of the 19th century a number of tombs had also been found near Gordon's Golgotha, and Gordon concluded that one of them must have been the tomb of Jesus. John also specifies that Jesus' tomb was located in a garden; consequently, an ancient wine press and cistern have been cited as evidence that the area had once been a garden, and the somewhat isolated tomb adjacent to the cistern has become identified as the Garden Tomb of Jesus. This particular tomb also has a stone groove running along the ground outside it, which Gordon argued to be a slot that once housed a stone, corresponding to the biblical account of a stone being rolled over the tomb entrance to close it.

Evangelicals and other Protestants consider the site to be the tomb of Jesus.

 Affiliation 
The garden is administered by the Garden Tomb Association, a member of the Evangelical Alliance of Israel and the World Evangelical Alliance.

Archaeological investigation and critical analysis
Golgotha
In the church
In the 20th century, archaeological findings enhanced the discussion concerning the authenticity of the traditional site at the Church of the Holy Sepulchre:
Prior to Constantine's time (r. 306–337), the site was a temple to Venus, built by Hadrian some time after 130.
Archaeology suggests that the traditional tomb would have been within Hadrian's temple, or likely to have been destroyed under the temple's heavy retaining wall.
 The temple's location complies with the typical layout of Roman cities (i.e. adjacent to the forum, at the intersection of the main north-south road with the main east-west road), rather than necessarily being a deliberate act of contempt for Christianity, as claimed in the past.
A spur would be required for the rockface to have included both the alleged site of the tomb and the tombs beyond the western end of the church.
The tombs west of the traditional site are dated to the first century, indicating that the site was outside the city at that time.

Knoll next to Garden Tomb
Besides the skull-like appearance (a modern-day argument), there are a few other details put forward in favour of the identification of Skull Hill as Golgotha. The location of the site would have made executions carried out there a highly visible sight to people using the main road leading north from the city; the presence of the skull-featured knoll in the background would have added to the deterrent effect.

Ancient views
Eusebius (260s – c. 340) comments that Golgotha was in his day pointed out "north of Mount Zion". Both the Garden Tomb's Golgotha and the Church of the Holy Sepulchre are north of the hill currently referred to as Mount Zion. Although in the Hebrew Bible the term Mount Zion referred to the Temple Mount or the spur south of it, which both lay east of Jerusalem's Central Valley, the name Mount Zion has been used for Jerusalem's western hill, both by Josephus in the first century AD, and in the Byzantine period by Christian sources.

Christians traditions
An extra-biblical Christian legend maintains that Golgotha (lit. "the skull") is Adam's burial site, while Talmudic-period Judaism held that Adam is buried in the cave of Machpelah in Hebron, and the name Golgotha is absent from Talmudic literature.Golgotha (literally, "the skull"). Jewish Encyclopedia (1906). The 1906 Jewish Encyclopedia'' states that the Talmudic-period rabbis created the concept that "Adam was created from the dust of the place where the sanctuary was to rise for the atonement of all human sin", i.e. the Jerusalem Temple's Holy of Holies, so that sin should not constitute a constant or characteristic attribute of human nature; Christians adapted this thought and relocated Adam's grave to what they considered to be the new place of atonement, Jesus' crucifixion site at Golgotha.

The Garden Tomb
The earliest detailed investigation of the tomb itself was a brief report prepared in 1874 by Conrad Schick, a German architect, archaeologist and Protestant missionary, but the fullest archaeological study of the area has been the seminal investigation by Gabriel Barkay, professor of Biblical archaeology at the Hebrew University of Jerusalem and at Bar-Ilan University, during the late twentieth century.

The tomb has two chambers, the second to the right of the first, with stone benches along the back wall of the first chamber, and along the sides of each wall in the second chamber, except the wall joining it to the first chamber; the benches have been heavily damaged but are still discernible. The edge of the groove outside the tomb has a diagonal edge, which would be unable to hold a stone slab in place (the slab would just fall out); additionally, known tombs of the rolling-stone type use vertical walls on either side of the entrance to hold the stone, not a groove on the ground.

Barkay concluded that:
 The tomb is far too old to be the tomb of Jesus, as it is typical of the 8th–7th centuries BCE, showing a configuration which fell out of use after that period. It fits well into a wider necropolis dating to the First Temple period which also includes the nearby tombs on the grounds of the Basilica of St Stephen.
 The groove was a water trough, built by the 11th-century Crusaders for donkeys/mules.
 The cistern was built as part of the same stable complex as the groove.
 The waterproofing on the cistern is of the type used by the Crusaders, and the cistern must date to that era.

In 1986, Barkay criticized defenders of the location of the garden and the Church of the Holy Sepulchre for making more theological and apologetic than scientific arguments.

In 2010, the director of the garden, Richard Meryon, claimed in an interview with "The Jerusalem Post" that each camp had academic and archaeological evidence in favor of the actual location, and that only one of the two could be right, but that the important thing was the symbolism of the place and especially the history of Jesus and not a guarantee of the exact site. In the same interview, Steve Bridge, a retired pastor volunteering in the garden, claimed that Catholic groups came to the site regularly, and that the guides did not play politics, with the emphasis on the crucifixion and the resurrection of Jesus.

Reception by Christian denominations
Due to the archaeological issues the Garden Tomb site raises, several scholars have rejected its claim to be Jesus' tomb. Author and explorer Paul Backholer concludes the emphasis on feelings in evangelical circles, has encouraged many to ‘feel’ the Garden Tomb is the location, despite evidence to the contrary. However, despite the archaeological discoveries, the Garden Tomb has become a popular place of pilgrimage among Protestants including, in the past, Anglicans.

The Garden Tomb has been the most favoured candidate site among leaders of the Church of Jesus Christ of Latter-day Saints.

Major Christian denominations, including the Roman Catholic and Eastern Orthodox Churches, do not accept the Garden Tomb as being the tomb of Jesus and hold fast to the traditional location at the Church of the Holy Sepulchre.

The British author, barrister and civil servant, Arthur William Crawley Boevey (1845–1913) produced for the Committee of the Garden Tomb Maintenance Fund in Jerusalem an introduction and guidebook to the site in 1894. The booklet has subsequently been revised and enlarged on several occasions, including by Mabel Bent in the early 1920s.

See also

 Zedekiah's Cave, part of the same ancient quarries

References

Bibliography

 
 
 
  Access to cited text currently not allowed (August 2021).
 
  Good text scan, but with blurred illustrations and captions; or here, a darker scan, but with fully visible illustrations.

External links

 
  This contains a detailed summary of the then-current theories as to the location of the tomb, with an extensive bibliography.

Buildings and structures completed in the 8th century BC
Buildings and structures completed in the 7th century BC
1867 archaeological discoveries
Alleged tombs of Jesus
Archaeological sites in Jerusalem
Rock-cut tombs
Anglican pilgrimage sites
Shrines in Jerusalem
Christian buildings and structures in the State of Palestine
Calvary
Tombs in Israel
East Jerusalem